Christian Rahn (born 15 June 1979) is a German former professional footballer who played as a left-back.

Club career
Born in Hamburg, Rahn began his career at FC St. Pauli and has had spells at Hamburger SV and 1. FC Köln. On 15 December 2008, he was released by FC Hansa Rostock. After this, he joined SpVgg Greuther Fürth. After being released by Fürth, he joined Jahn Regensburg on 2 August 2012. Following Regensburg's relegation from the 2. Bundesliga he rejoined his childhood club St. Pauli, playing for and also captaining their reserve squad.

International career 
On 9 May 2002, Rahn made his debut for the Germany national team in a 7–0 friendly victory in preparation for the 2002 FIFA World Cup against Kuwait. Five days later he was not used for a 1–0 defeat in Cardiff against Wales and one day later Rudi Völler announced that Rahn would not participate in the World Cup. On 31 March 2004, Rahn was called up again for the national team for a 3–0 victory in Cologne against Belgium when he replaced Michael Ballack in the 84th minute. Rahn was initially named in Völler's UEFA Euro 2004 squad,  but had to withdraw through injury and was replaced by Christian Ziege.

Honours
Hamburger SV
DFL-Ligapokal: 2003

References

External links 
 
 
 

1979 births
Living people
German footballers
Footballers from Hamburg
Association football defenders
Association football midfielders
Germany international footballers
Germany under-21 international footballers
Bundesliga players
2. Bundesliga players
Regionalliga players
FC St. Pauli players
Hamburger SV players
1. FC Köln players
FC Hansa Rostock players
SpVgg Greuther Fürth players
SSV Jahn Regensburg players